The surname Brandler may refer to "brandt" (to burn) and it is believed by the Brandler family it refers to burning wine, i.e. brandy maker. According to Hans Brandler, 1917–2011, the family tree goes back to the 1750s and has direct branches in Los Angeles, Chicago, Washington DC,  Israel, Germany, and numerous other countries

Andrew Brandler (born ), Hong Kong business executive
Anneliese Brandler (1904-1970), German chess master
John Brandler is an art dealer in Brentwood, Essex 
Heinrich Brandler (1881 - 1967), leader of the Communist Party of Germany and various communist opposition groups
Markus Brandler was a judge - see the Patti Hearst Trial 
another Brandler has a climb on the Matterhorn named after him (Lothar Brandler, German mountaineer, born 1936)

German-language surnames